Substructure may refer to:

 Substructure (engineering)
 Substructure (mathematics)
 Substructure (marxist theory)